John J. Thompson (August 14, 1838 - July 2, 1915) was a German-born soldier in the Union Army in the American Civil War. The medal was granted for actions at the Battle of Hatcher's Run on 6 February, 1865 whilst serving as a Corporal in the 1st Maryland Infantry. Thompson was born in Holstein, Germany and died in Baltimore, Maryland where he was buried in Immanuel Cemetery.

Medal of Honor Citation 
As color bearer with most conspicuous gallantry preceded his regiment in the assault and planted his flag upon the enemy's works.

Date Issued: 10 September, 1897

References 

1838 births
1915 deaths
American Civil War recipients of the Medal of Honor
United States Army Medal of Honor recipients